Felise Kaufusi (born 19 May 1992) is a professional rugby league footballer who plays as a er for the Dolphins in the NRL, and has played for Tonga and Australia at international level. 

He previously played for the Melbourne Storm and won the 2017 NRL Grand Final and 2020 NRL Grand Finals with the Storm. Kaufusi has also played for the Queensland Maroons.

Early life
Kaufusi was born in Auckland, New Zealand, and is of Tongan and Niuean descent. He is the younger brother of Antonio and older brother of Patrick.

Felise moved to Australia as a 7 year old and was educated at Shalom Catholic College, Bundaberg. He played his junior football for the Bundaberg Brothers, before being signed by the North Queensland Cowboys.

Playing career

Early career
From 2010 to 2012, Kaufusi played for the North Queensland Cowboys' NYC team. On 2 October 2011, Kaufusi played in the Cowboys' 2011 NYC Grand Final 31-30 Golden Point Extra Time loss to the New Zealand Warriors. On 28 June 2012, he re-signed with the Cowboys on a 1-year contract. In 2013, he moved on to the Cowboys' Queensland Cup team, Northern Pride RLFC. On 21 August 2013, he signed a 1-year contract with the Melbourne Storm starting in 2014. In July 2014, he played for the Queensland Residents against the New South Wales Residents.

2015
In Round 1 of the 2015 NRL season, Kaufusi made his NRL debut for the Melbourne Storm against the St. George Illawarra Dragons, playing off the interchange bench in the 12-4 win at Jubilee Oval. In Round 4 against the North Queensland Cowboys, Kaufusi scored his first NRL career try in the Storm’s 18-17 loss at 1300SMILES Stadium. On 2 May 2015, he played for Tonga against Samoa in the Polynesian Cup. On 2 July 2015, Kaufusi re-signed with the Storm on a 2-year contract.

2016
On 7 May, Kaufusi played for Tonga against Samoa in the 2016 Polynesian Cup. On 6 July, he was named as 18th man for Queensland in Game 3 of the 2016 State of Origin series. Kaufusi was named as 18th man for the Storm in their 2016 NRL Grand Final clash against the Cronulla-Sutherland Sharks but didn’t play in the 14-12 thrilling loss. Kaufusi finished the 2016 NRL season with him playing in 21 matches and scoring 4 tries for the Storm.

2017
On 21 April 2017, Kaufusi re-signed his contract with the Storm to the end of the 2019 season. On 6 May 2017, Kaufusi played for Tonga against Fiji in the 2017 Pacific Test, where he started at second-row in the 26-24 win at Campbelltown Stadium. During the season, Kaufusi took over the void second-row position from the departed Kevin Proctor and he took the opportunity by both hands and was instrumental for the Storm to their run leading up to the Finals series where they the winners of the Minor Premiership trophy. On 1 October 2017, in the Storm’s 2017 NRL Grand Final against the North Queensland Cowboys, Kaufusi started at second-row and scored a try in the 34-6 victory. Kaufusi finished his breakout 2017 NRL season with him playing all of the Storm’s 27 matches and scored 9 tries. On 3 October 2017, two days after the Grand Final win, Kaufusi was rewarded with selection in the 24-man Kangaroos squad for the 2017 Rugby League World Cup. On 3 November 2017, Kaufusi made his test debut for Australia against France, where he played off the interchange bench in the 52-6 win at Canberra Stadium.

2018
In Round 1, Kaufusi suffered a hamstring injury being sidelined for three weeks. In May, he signed a two-year extension to remain with the Melbourne Storm.

Kaufusi made his debut for Queensland in Game 1 of the 2018 State of Origin series, starting at second-row in all three games. He then featured in the Melbourne Storm's Grand Final loss to the Sydney Roosters. Kaufusi played in 21 games for the Storm in 2018, scoring five tries. Kaufusi played for Australia in the end of season tests vs New Zealand and Tonga.

2019
He played 25 games for Melbourne in the 2019 NRL season as the club finished as runaway Minor Premiers, however the club fell short of another grand final after capitulating against the Sydney Roosters in the preliminary final.

2020
He played 21 games for Melbourne in the 2020 NRL season including the club's 2020 NRL Grand Final victory over Penrith.

2021
In round 2 against Parramatta, Kaufusi was placed on report after an ugly tackle on Parramatta player Ryan Matterson during Melbourne's defeat.  As a result, Matterson missed the following five matches whilst Kaufusi was suspended for three games.

In round 10, Kaufusi was placed on report for tripping a St. George Illawarra player during the club's victory but later beat the charge and was then selected for Queensland to play in the 2021 State of Origin series. 

A photo of New South Wales player Jarome Luai later went viral showing Luai standing over Kaufusi and taunting him.  Kaufusi later said of the photo “I don’t think I need any more motivation than that thrashing we copped," he said.
"I’ve kept the receipts there and hopefully turn that around on Sunday.  "I can’t remember what he said to me, I was pretty filthy at myself to be honest. I think I must have got steamrolled".

On 26 November 2021, Kaufusi became the second player, but the first with NRL experience, to sign with Redcliffe based expansion team Dolphins for the 2023 NRL season.

2022
Kaufusi was selected by Queensland for game one of the 2022 State of Origin series. In game two, he scored a try but was later sin binned for a professional foul during Queensland's 44-12 loss against New South Wales.

Career stats

Club 

* = Unfinished season

Representative

Honours

Club
 2016 NRL Grand Final – Runner-up
 2017 NRL Grand Final – Winners
 2018 World Club Challenge – Winners
 2018 NRL Grand Final – Runner-up
 2020 NRL Grand Final – Winners

Individual
Melbourne Storm
 2017 – Most Improved Player of the Year

References

External links
Melbourne Storm profile
2017 RLWC profile

1992 births
Living people
New Zealand rugby league players
New Zealand people of Niuean descent
New Zealand sportspeople of Tongan descent
Tonga national rugby league team players
Australia national rugby league team players
Queensland Rugby League State of Origin players
Melbourne Storm players
Dolphins (NRL) players
Eastern Suburbs Tigers players
Northern Pride RLFC players
New Zealand emigrants to Australia
Rugby league players from Auckland
Rugby league props
Sunshine Coast Falcons players